A neutrino is an elementary particle. 

Neutrino may also refer to: 

 QNX Neutrino, an operating system
 Team Neutrino, a FIRST Robotics Competition team
 Neutrino, a suborbital spacecraft in development by Interorbital Systems
 , or Neytrino, a village near Baksan Neutrino Observatory in Elbrussky District of Kabardino-Balkar Republic, Russia
 Neutrino (JavaScript library)

Fiction
 Neutrinos (Teenage Mutant Ninja Turtles), characters in the TV show
 Neutrino 2000, a series of guns used in the Artemis Fowl books

See also
 Neutrino Factory, a proposed particle accelerator complex 
 Poppa Neutrino, born William David Pearlman (1933–2011), musician and "free spirit"
 Oxide & Neutrino, a UK garage/rap duo
 Neutralino, a hypothetical particle